John Habersham (December 23, 1754 – December 17, 1799) was an American merchant, planter, and soldier from Georgia. He was the son of loyalist official James Habersham, the younger brother of patriot leader Joseph Habersham. They were both the younger brothers of James Habersham Jr. He served as an officer in the 1st Georgia Regiment during the American Revolutionary War. He was a delegate to the Congress of the Confederation in 1785.  John Habersham was a member of the Society of the Cincinnati of the State of Georgia.

In the 1780s, Habersham owned Bonaventure Plantation.

Upon his death in 1799, he was buried in Savannah's Colonial Park Cemetery.

References

External links
Habersham’s Congressional biography

Habersham Brothers historical marker

 American Revolution Institute

1754 births
1799 deaths
18th-century American politicians
American slave owners
Continental Army officers from Georgia (U.S. state)
Continental Congressmen from Georgia (U.S. state)